Parachlorobenzotrifluoride is a synthetic halogenated organic chemical compound with the molecular formula C7H4ClF3. It is frequently abbreviated PCBTF. Parachlorobenzotrifluoride is a colorless liquid with a distinct aromatic odor. PCBTF has been commercially-produced since the 1960s, initially as an intermediate in the production of other petrochemicals. But since the 1990s, it has been primarily used as a solvent.

History
Occidental Chemical Corporation was a leading producer and sold it as part of its Oxsol® product line, specifically under the brand name of Oxsol 100. Occidental Chemical Corporation sold the OXSOL line to an Israeli company, Makhteshim Agan Industries, Ltd., in 2002.

Uses
PCBTF is increasingly used as a xylene replacement in cleaners, thinners, and other aromatic hydrocarbon blends.

PCBTF is used as a component (5-12%) of low volatile organic compound (VOC) compliant polyurethane finishes.  

The substance is used as an ink solvent in the printing industry. Parachlorobenzotrifluoride has a high capacity for dissolving many inks used by the printing industry. In most cases, up to 22 grams of ink can be dissolved in 20 grams of PCBTF. An added benefit is that parachlorobenzotrifluoride dissolves most inks faster than toluene.

Health and Environmental effects
Health effects:
 Points of entry: eyes, ingestion, inhalation, skin.
 Target organs: central nervous system, kidneys, liver.
 Irritancy: eyes, respiratory tract, skin

In the troposphere, PCBTF has an estimated half-life of 67 days. It is transformed by reaction with photochemically-produced hydroxyl radicals to give mainly 2-chloro-5-trifluoromethylphenol.

Regulation
PCBTF currently has VOC Exempt status from the U.S. Environmental Protection Agency. However, California's Office of Environmental Health Hazard Assessment (OEHHA) has adopted inhalation risk factors for PCBTF as of June 2019, which could have implications for its ongoing VOC Exempt status.

References

Halogenated solvents
Chloroarenes
Trifluoromethyl compounds